Uşak is a city in the interior part of the Aegean Region of Turkey. The city has a population of 500,000 (2016 census) and is the capital of Uşak Province.

Benefiting from its location at the crossroads of the Central Anatolian plateau and the coastal Aegean Region, and from a climate and agricultural production incorporating elements of both of these zones, Uşak has also traditionally had a strong industrial base. Uşak was the first city in Turkey to have an urban electricity network, and the first city where a collective labor relations agreement was signed, during the Ottoman era, between leather industry employees and workers. It was here that the first factory of Republican Turkey, a sugar refinery, was set up through a private sector initiative among local businessmen. The tradition of industriousness continues today around two industrial zones.

History

The first known organized states to have ruled over the region of present-day Uşak were the Phrygians in the eastern portion and the Lydians in the west during the seventh century BC.  The Karun Treasure, discovered by clandestine treasure hunters in Uşak in 1965, and whose smuggling outside Turkey and subsequent retrieval decades later from New York City's Metropolitan Museum of Art made international headlines, gives an indication of the high degree of civilization attained by these Anatolian states. The region of Lydia was later taken over by the Persian Empire in the 6th century BC and by Alexander the Great and his successors as of the 4th century.  Thereafter, Uşak was ruled successively by the Roman Empire, the Byzantine Empire, the Seljuks, the Germiyanids and finally the Ottoman Empire (as of 1429).

Later, following Turkish conquest and domination over the area, the city became known by its Turkish name of Uşak; which means "servant." From 1867 until 1922, Uşak was part of Hüdavendigâr vilayet.

Uşak was occupied by the Greek Army between 28 August 1920 and 1 September 1922. During the Greek retreat, Greek general Nikolaos Trikoupis was captured near Uşak at the village of Göğem, today buried under a dam reservoir.

Uşak was a district center within Kütahya Province until 1953, when Uşak Province was constituted and Uşak became its provincial capital.

Economic history
At least since the 17th century there was trade between Uşak and the Dutch republic as reflected in the rug shown thrown over the bannister in Vermeer's painting "The Procuress." The rug was probably produced in Uşak, covers a third of the painting and shows medallions and leaves. 

In the early 20th century, mercury was discovered in Uşak. The town also manufactured carpet.

Among other district centers in Uşak Province, Banaz is the largest and is notable for its varied agricultural production as well as for its forests, while Ulubey's canyon is a natural site attracting many visitors.

Climate
Uşak has a Mediterranean (Köppen: Csa) or an oceanic climate (Trewartha: Doak), with cool, wet, regularly snowy winters and hot, dry summers.

Uşak carpets

In pre-industrial times, Uşak was already a major center of production and export, particularly of Ushak carpets. Ushak carpets are also called Holbein carpets in reference to the 16th century painter Hans Holbein the Younger who depicted them in minute detail in his paintings, reflecting their popularity in European markets. The level of international popularity attained by Uşak's carpets became such that the word "Ushak" is considered an English word of Turkic origin.

Although Uşak's carpet patterns have evolved since then, large-scale weaving still continues and the name of the city still has an important presence in the market for carpets, both hand-woven and industrial. On the other hand, the district of Eşme, which is also in Uşak Province, is famous for its kilims.

Twin cities
  Offenbach - Germany
  Nur-Sultan - Kazakhstan
  Besni - Turkey
  Charleroi - Belgium

See also
 Ushak carpet
 Karun Treasure
 Uşak Museum of Archaeology

References

 
Populated places in Uşak Province
Cities in Turkey
Districts of Uşak Province
Landforms of Uşak Province